Kacper is a predominantly Polish masculine given name a variant of Caspar. Notable people called Kacper include:

Kacper Denhoff (1587–1645), Baltic-German noble of the Holy Roman Empire; a noble of the Polish-Lithuanian Commonwealth; Governor of Dorpat Province
Kacper Filipiak (born 1995), Polish former professional snooker player
Kacper Gomolski (born 1993), Polish motorcycle speedway rider who rides for the Poole Pirates in the Elite League
Kacper Kosinski, member of The Analogs, a Polish street punk band
Kacper Kozłowski (born 1986), Polish sprint athlete who specializes in the 400 metres
Kacper Ławski (born 1985), Polish rugby player, second or third line of the lock in the French club CS Vienne
Kacper Łazaj (born 1995), Polish footballer
Kacper Majchrzak (born 1992), Polish swimmer
Bronislaw Kacper Malinowski (1884–1942), Polish anthropologist
Kacper Piechocki (born 1995), Polish volleyball player
Kacper Piorun (born 1991), Polish chess grandmaster (2012)
Kacper Przybyłko (born 1993), Polish footballer
Kacper Sikora (born 1992), Polish singer who won the fourth series of Poland's Got Talent in 2011
Kacper Tatara (born 1988), Polish footballer
Kacper Jednorowicz (born 1999), Polish entrepreneur
Kacper Ziemiński (born 1990), Polish sailor

See also
Kacper Ryx, Polish historical crime novel written by Mariusz Wollny
Kacperków

Polish masculine given names